The 1918–19 season was the fourth and final season of special wartime football in England during the First World War.

Overview
Between 1915 and 1919 competitive football was suspended in England. Many footballers signed up to fight in the war and as a result many teams were depleted, and fielded guest players instead. The Football League and FA Cup were suspended and in their place regional league competitions were set up; appearances in these tournaments do not count in players' official records.

Honours
There were six regional leagues. The Lancashire and Midland Sections of the Football League were split into a principal tournament, consisting of a single league, and then a subsidiary tournament of four groups.

A championship playoff was held between Nottingham Forest and Everton, which Forest won 1–0 on aggregate.

See also
England national football team results (unofficial matches)

References

 
Wartime seasons in English football